The Hastings Museum of Natural and Cultural History is located in Hastings, Nebraska. It claims to be the largest municipal museum between Chicago and Denver.  It is housed in a building funded by the Works Progress Administration and dedicated on June 15, 1939. The museum exhibits include Kool-Aid, natural history dioramas, local history, weapons, life of pioneers on the Plains, rocks, minerals, fossils, antique vehicles, coins, and a planetarium.

Governance
The Museum is under the jurisdiction of the City of Hastings and all employees are personnel of the Hastings government. The museum is governed by a 7-member board, with each member serving a term of 5 years. The board has the power to adopt rulesand it has control of the Museum funds. The board is responsible to the Mayor and City Council of Hastings, Nebraska. It is also supported by a Foundation to increase awareness and support, which was incorporated in 1985.

The Hastings Museum of Natural and Cultural History displays natural and cultural histories of Hastings, Adams County and the Great Plains of Nebraska. Founded in 1926 by Albert Brooking, it became home to his collection of Native American artifacts, fossils, and mounted birds. Albert Brookings’s bird collection was one of the largest in the United States. Other exhibits include natural history dioramas, an extensive armaments collection, and the history of Edwin Perkins, a local merchant famous for inventing Kool-Aid in 1927. The museum hosts an annual Native American festival. The Hastings Public Library and Adams County Historical Society are both at the museum.

See also
 List of museums in Nebraska
 Pioneer Village, located about 30 miles west in Minden, Nebraska.
 Nebraska Prairie Museum, located about 55 miles west in Holdrege, Nebraska.
Stuhr Museum, aka Stuhr Museum of the Prairie Pioneer, in Grand Island, Nebraska

References

External links
Hastings Museum

Museums in Adams County, Nebraska
History museums in Nebraska
Buildings and structures in Hastings, Nebraska
Natural history museums in Nebraska
Planetaria in the United States